The 1995 British National Track Championships were a series of track cycling competitions held from 29 July – 5 August 1995 at the Manchester Velodrome. The Championships were organised by the British Cycling Federation. It was the first championships held at the new Manchester Velodrome  following British Cycling moving their headquarters to the National Cycling Centre, Manchester, in November 1994.

Steve Paulding was awarded the Keirin title after Shawn Lynch was stripped of the title following a positive drugs test during an event in June.

Medal summary

Men's Events

Women's Events

References

National Track Championships
National Track Championships
National Track Championships